The William Anderson House is a single-family home located at 2301 Packard Road in Ann Arbor, Michigan. It was listed on the National Register of Historic Places in 1983.

History
There is little known about William Anderson's early life, save that he likely came from Orange County, New York and settled in Michigan in about 1832. In 1833 he purchased two tracts of land, one of which is where this house now stands. Anderson served as Washtenaw County's first sheriff from 1835 to 1839. In about 1853 he constructed this house. In 1858, Anderson deeded the house and surrounding farm to his son, William E. Anderson. Anderson owned the house until his death in 1873, after which the house passed to his wife and then his children. In 1932, the house was foreclosed on and passed out of the Anderson family.

In 1937, Dr. Inez R. Wisdom purchased the house for use as a residence and medical office. In 1952 she gave a portion of the property to St. Clare of Assisi Episcopal Church to construct a new church building. The house was given to the church some time after Wisdom's death.

Description
The William Anderson House is a one-and-a-half-story, end gable, Greek Revival house with a gabled rear wing and a later rear shed-roof addition. The house sits on a fieldstone foundation. The front facade has a portico of four square pillars supporting a classical pediment and an entablature. The frieze above is pierced with decorative grilled panels. The house is clad with vertical, board-and-batten siding. The first-floor windows are six-over-six, double-hung units with triple-light eyebrow windows above in the frieze on the sides of the house.

References

		
National Register of Historic Places in Washtenaw County, Michigan
Michigan State Historic Sites in Washtenaw County, Michigan
Greek Revival architecture in Michigan
Residential buildings completed in 1853
Houses in Ann Arbor, Michigan